Lungile Gongqa (born 22 February 1979) is a South African long distance runner who specialises in the marathon. He competed in the men's marathon event at the 2016 Summer Olympics. However, he dropped out of the race before the 35 km mark and did not finish the race. Gongqa won the 2017 Two Oceans Marathon. He hails from Khayelitsha in Cape Town. In 2019, he finished in 2nd place in the men's race at the IAU 50 km World Championships.

References

External links
 

1979 births
Living people
South African male long-distance runners
South African male marathon runners
Place of birth missing (living people)
Athletes (track and field) at the 2016 Summer Olympics
Olympic athletes of South Africa
South African ultramarathon runners